Norway is sometimes referred to as "The Neutral Ally". During World War I, while theoretically a neutral country, diplomatic pressure from the British government prompted the government to favour Britain highly in relation to Norway's large shipping fleet and vast fish supplies. The term was coined by Norwegian historian Olav Riste in the 1960s.

In 1905, when Norway gained independence, the nation's politicians agreed that Norway should remain neutral in international conflicts. Since the Great powers had no desire for unrest in Scandinavia, they signed an agreement respecting Norway's neutrality. Still, the political direction was clear: fearing Russian ambition in the north, the sentiment was that Norway should be neutral if war broke out, and rely on help from Great Britain if attacked.

This affinity westwards was substantiated by international trade. In the early 1900s, Norway's merchant fleet was one of the largest in the world, and the country required vast supplies of oil, coal and steel to build and operate it. When war broke out in 1914, Norway was exporting great amounts of fish to Germans and British alike, much to the dismay of the British government. The Allies started preventing the Germans from purchasing these fish stocks by overbidding them, but trade in other areas continued. Imports of Norwegian copper ore, nickel and pyrite were vital to the German war industry, and by the end of 1916, the Norwegian government was put under heavy diplomatic pressure from the Allies. Several agreements were made, none completely satisfying to the British government.

On Christmas Eve 1916, the British government issued an ultimatum, informing the Norwegian Foreign Minister, Nils Claus Ihlen, that British exports of coal to Norway would cease unless trade with Germany stopped. The Norwegian government weighed their options, and eventually agreed to the ultimatum. This coincided with Germany's expansion of unrestricted submarine warfare at the beginning of 1917. In total, 436 Norwegian ships were sunk by German submarines in the period 1914–1917, out of 847 in the course of the whole war. More than 1,150 Norwegian sailors died during this period, creating an increasingly anti-German sentiment throughout the nation of Norway.

Thus, both commerce and political sympathies tied Norway and Britain together during World War I, even though Norway remained officially neutral.

See also 
 Espionage in Norway during World War I

References

Further reading
 Frey, Marc. "The neutrals and World War One," Forsvarsstudier no. 3 (2000) pp 4–39 online
 Haug, Karl Erik. "Norway", in: 1914–1918-online. International Encyclopedia of the First World War, ed. by Ute Daniel, et al. (Freie Universität Berlin, 2016). online
 Riste, Olav. The Neutral Ally: Norway's relations with belligerent powers in the First World War (1995)

Military history of Norway
World War I
Non-interventionism
Norway in World War I
Norway–United Kingdom relations
Ultimata